Heritage registers in Belgium include immovable heritage such as World Heritage Sites, and National heritage sites, but also intangible cultural heritage. The agency responsible for keeping and updating inventories of immovable heritage is dependent on the region, as is the name for the object, which is called Beschermd erfgoed, Biens classés or Kulturdenkmal depending on the language of the municipality of the location.

Three National heritage organizations

In 1835 the Commission royale des monuments et des sites (Royal committee for monuments and sites) was created to advise the government on conservation and historic preservation. This committee was split in 1968 into a Flanders committee (Koninklijke Commissie voor Monumenten en Landschappen) and a Wallonian committee, and in 1993 a third committee was formed to administer the area of Brussels.

Walloon region
In the Walloon region, the organization of the European Heritage Days and the classification of objects is done by the Agence wallonne du Patrimoine (AWaP)

East Belgium
The German-speaking Community of Belgium, part of the area known as "East Belgium" also hosts the European Heritage Days, and calls them "Tage des offenen Denkmals". The heritage protection of East Belgium falls under the jurisdiction of Liège province.
 Lists of protected heritage sites in the German-speaking Community of Belgium

Heritage lists of Wallonia 
 Lists of protected heritage sites in Hainaut (province)
 Lists of protected heritage sites in Liège (province)
 Lists of protected heritage sites in Luxembourg (Belgium)
 Lists of protected heritage sites in Namur (province)
 Lists of protected heritage sites in Walloon Brabant

Flanders

One agency, the Flemish organization for Immovable Heritage and three of its subdivisions are responsible for protection; the VIOE, the Organization for KCML. Ruimte en Erfgoed, Onroerend Erfgoed, and the agent for inspection, the RWO.

Heritage lists of Flanders 
Lists of immovable heritage sites in Antwerp (province)
Lists of immovable heritage sites in Limburg (Belgium)
Lists of immovable heritage sites in East Flanders
Lists of immovable heritage sites in Flemish Brabant
Lists of immovable heritage sites in West Flanders

Brussels 
The Brussels-Capital Region has their own protection agency called Monuments & Sites (in French: Monuments et sites de l'Administration de l'Aménagement du Territoire et du Logement Ministère de la Région de Bruxelles-Capitale, and in Dutch: Monumenten en Landschappen van het Bestuur Ruimtelijke Ordening en Huisvesting van het Ministerie Brussels Hoofdstedelijk Gewest). They publish the inventory of protected heritage sites and coordinate the European Heritage Days as well as the marking of local heritage sites with their own logo. See the List of protected heritage sites in the Brussels-Capital Region for the protected objects.

See also
 Beschermd erfgoed
 Culture of Belgium

References

External links 

 Official website KCML Flanders
 Official website CRMSF Wallonia
 Official website KCML Brussels
 The covenant on heritage
 Databank of the Inventory of the Flemish architectural monuments

 
Belgian culture
Law of Belgium